Twining is a surname. Notable people with the surname include:

William Twining (military physician) (1790–1835), British military physician
Dick Twining (1889–1979), English cricketer
Edward Twining (1899–1967), British diplomat and author
Elizabeth Twining (1805–1889), English botanical illustrator
Ernest W. Twining (1875–1956), English modelmaker, artist, and engineer
James Twining (born 1972), British author of thriller novels
Luella Twining (1871–1939), Labor activist
Merrill B. Twining (1902–1996), American Marine Corps general
Nathan Crook Twining (1869–1924), American Navy admiral
Nathan Farragut Twining (1897–1982), American Air Force general, Air Force Chief of Staff; Chairman Joint Chiefs of Staff 1957–1960
Thomas Twining (merchant) (1675–1741), English merchant and founder of the Twinings tea company
Thomas Twining (scholar) (1735–1804), English classical scholar
William Twining (1934- ), English professor of law